Så møtes vi imorgen is a 1946 Norwegian drama film directed by Nils R. Müller. It was Müller's debut film. It is based on the novel of the same name by Alex Brinchmann and it was adapted for film by Müller. The film tells the story of the young maladapted Steffen Berg, played by Georg Richter.

Plot
The young student Steffen Berg has difficulty adapting to society's laws and rules. After interrupting his medical studies, he starts working in a shop to support his family together with his brother Jørgen and his sister Gerda, and to keep his mother from moving to a retirement home. One of Steffen's friends is going to America with his wife and needs money. Steffen takes 500 kroner from the store's cash register. The next day there is an audit, and Steffen's theft is discovered. His brother pays back the money in exchange for the store dropping the charges.

Steffen starts working in a greenhouse, and in the evenings he studies art history. A paper he writes about the Parthenon is well received. Steffen decided to continue his studies. His past, however, makes it impossible for him to receive a scholarship and, after a conflict with his brother, he wanders the streets of Oslo. When Steffen passes Henrik Storm's office, he hears a shot fired and sees a man leaving the place in a car. Some time later, Steffen saves a little girl from being run over by a car. The girl's parents are very grateful and, when they hear that he is unemployed, they offer him a job as a gardener.

At his new employer's, Steffen recognizes a man from Storm's office named Konrad. In the newspapers he reads that Storm has been murdered. Steffen wants to go to the police, but he changes his mind at the last minute after being persuaded by Konrad's wife Marit. Marit is much younger than her husband, and she is attracted to the young Steffen. Steffen also learns that Storm was attracted to Marit and that Konrad killed him out of jealousy.

One night Konrad unexpectedly finds Steffen and Marit together. He later takes Steffen on a trip to the mountains. It soon becomes clear to Steffen that Konrad intends to kill him. Steffen jerks the steering wheel of the car they are driving, and the vehicle drives off the road. Konrad dies and Steffen survives.

Cast
Georg Richter as Steffen Berg
Ola Isene as Konrad Kraft
Helen Brinchmann as Marit Kraft
Harald Heide Steen as Jørgen Berg
Unni Torkildsen as Gerda Berg
Ellen Isefiær as Mrs. Berg, Steffen's mother
Einar Vaage as Rasmussen
Helge Essmar as the prison warden
Alfred Helgeby as the museum director
Stevelin Urdahl as the politician
Jack Fjeldstad as the police inspector
Alf Sommer as the warehouse manager
Pehr Qværnstrøm as the office manager
Pål Skjønberg as Erik, a friend of Steffen
Elisabeth Bang  as Erik's girlfriend
Knut Yran as the pawnbroker
Gudrun Heide as the bedsit landlady
Knut Myrvold as the detective
Bjarne Bø as a gardener
Per Eigil Hansson as a gardener

References

External links
 
 Så møtes vi imorgen at Norsk filmografi

1946 films
Norwegian drama films
Norwegian black-and-white films
1946 drama films
1940s Norwegian-language films
Films directed by Nils R. Müller